Linda Klarfeld (born 19 July 1976) is an Australian sculptor whose bronze and granite works of art focus on the human figure.  Her work ranges from small miniature portrait busts to three meter high, larger than life size pieces.  She has sold her work both privately and through public auction.

Early life 
Born in Prague, Czech Republic, Klarfeld's family immigrated to Australia in 1980. Her father was a drummer with various rock bands including Framus Five and The Cardinals, and Klarfeld credits his influence on her developing creativity.

Her family settled in Sydney, where she attended Bonnyrigg Public School and Chatswood High School.  Her parents encouraged her to pursue her creativity, so after leaving high school she began a seven-year-long sculpture apprenticeship that introduced her to different sculptors from around the world.  She studied under sculptors Ctibor Havelka and Vaclav Skalicky and sculpture technician Vanessa Hoheb.  She studied at the Střední průmyslová škola kamenická a sochařská v Hořicích, an international Stone Sculptors School in Horice, Czech Republic.

Career 
1988 – 1995 (Teenage Years)

At the age of 14 Klarfeld sold her first sculpture and shortly after announced to her family her intention of becoming a sculptor.  She won several prizes for her work during her teenage years. Portrait busts she created of her father were exhibited in ArtExpress 1994.  She won major prizes for Senior Sculpture at the Mosman Youth Art Prize for her sculptures ‘King Lear’, ‘Adolescent’ and ‘The Joyful Season’.

1996 – 2005 (Twenties)

Klarfeld was awarded a Bachelor of Arts in Psychology from Macquarie University. She said that studying psychology, especially human behaviour, enriched her art.  “I learned to observe people more closely” she said.  “I was inspired to create the Macquarie University Graduates while watching the procession at my own graduation ceremony.”

During this time, a number of significant events occurred in Klarfeld's life.  One such event was she met Joan Abela, who became a patron of her work and provided the impetus for Klarfeld's career.  Ms Abela commissioned a series of sculptures for her private castle-themed residence, ”Jeandare”.

At the age of 21, Klarfeld's first solo exhibition was opened by Australian Adventurer Dick Smith.

At 22, Klarfeld received her first major religious commission to create “Gethsemane and The Way of the Cross 2000”. This was followed by numerous public commissions including a life-size bronze sculpture of Rugby League Footballer Peter Gallagher and 'Expressions of Love', a 16 statue centerpiece for the Hunter Valley Gardens.

2006 – 2015 (Thirties)

Klarfeld created several sculptures of well-known Australians, including Dr Victor Chang, Cricketers Keith Miller and Bill Woodfull, AFL Footballer Neil Roberts and former Mayor of Mosman, Cr Dom Lopez OAM. 
In her private work she began focusing on the world of business and created the “Board of Directors Series”, a collection of semi-abstract sculptures depicting the archetypes of the business world. This was followed by an exhibition recognizing  11 leading Australian business identities in a collection of realistic portrait busts called “Icons of Business”.
During her thirties, Klarfeld has established a reputation amongst religious institutions for her sculptures focusing on emotional and dramatic religious themes.  Her well-known religious pieces include St Marcellin Champagnat 2012 and St Mary Mackillop 2011.

Table Of Works

References 

1976 births
Living people
Artists from Prague
Czech sculptors
Czech women sculptors
Czechoslovak emigrants to Australia
21st-century Australian sculptors
20th-century Australian sculptors
20th-century Australian women artists
21st-century Australian women artists